Biwater F.C. was an English football club based in Clay Cross, Derbyshire.

History
They were known as Clay Cross Works until 1988. Under their former name they reached the 4th round of the FA Vase in 1980.

Records
FA Vase
 4th round – 1979–80

References

Defunct football clubs in Derbyshire
East Midlands Regional League
Central Midlands Football League
Midland Football League (1889)
Defunct football clubs in England